Gnathifera is a genus of moths in the family Epermeniidae.

Species
Gnathifera acacivorella Gaedike, 1968 (originally in Ochromolopis) (Australia)
Gnathifera aphronesa (Meyrick, 1897) (originally in Epermenia) (Australia: Tasmania)
Gnathifera australica (Gaedike, 1968) (originally in Ochromolopis) (Australia)
Gnathifera bidentella (Australia)
Gnathifera bipunctata (Gaedike, 1968) (originally in Ochromolopis) (Australia)
Gnathifera queenslandi (Gaedike, 1968) (originally in Ochromolopis)
Gnathifera eurybias (Meyrick, 1897) (originally in Epermenia) (Australia: Tasmania)
Gnathifera hollowayi Gaedike, 1981
Gnathifera opsias (Meyrick, 1897) (originally in Epermenia) (Australia: Tasmania)
Gnathifera paraphronesa (Gaedike, 1968) (originally in Ochromolopis)
Gnathifera paropsias (Gaedike, 1972) (originally in Ochromolopis) (Australia)
Gnathifera proserga (Meyrick, 1913)
Gnathifera pseudaphronesa (Gaedike, 1972) (originally in Ochromolopis) (Australia)
Gnathifera punctata Gaedike, 2013
Gnathifera uptonella (Gaedike, 1968) (originally in Ochromolopis) (Australia)

References

 , 2004: New genera and species of epermeniid moths from the Afrotropical Region (Lepidoptera: Epermeniidae). Annals of the Transvaal Museum 41: 41–59.
  2013: New or poorly known Epermeniidae of the Afrotropis (Lepidoptera, Epermenioidea).  Beiträge zur Entomologie 63(1): 149-168. Abstract: 

Epermeniidae
Moth genera